Josef Struna was a Czech wrestler. He competed in the Greco-Roman heavyweight event at the 1920 Summer Olympics.

References

External links
 

Year of birth missing
Year of death missing
Olympic wrestlers of Czechoslovakia
Wrestlers at the 1920 Summer Olympics
Czech male sport wrestlers
Place of birth missing